The Palm Beach Cardinals are a Minor League Baseball team of the Florida State League and the Single-A affiliate of the St. Louis Cardinals. They are located in the town of Jupiter in Palm Beach County, Florida, and play their home games at Roger Dean Chevrolet Stadium. Opened in 1998, the park seats 6,871 people. They share the facility with the Jupiter Hammerheads, also of the Florida State League.

Season-by-season results

 The championship series was canceled due to the impending threat from Hurricane Irma.

Roster

References

External links
 
 Statistics from Baseball-Reference

St. Louis Cardinals minor league affiliates
Baseball teams established in 2003
Professional baseball teams in Florida
Sports in the Miami metropolitan area
2003 establishments in Florida
Florida State League teams